Rodney Ollinger was a college football player for the Auburn Tigers football team. He played first for Spring Hill, where he was a renowned punter. Ollinger was an end for coach Mike Donahue's team, a member of the Southern Intercollegiate Athletic Association (SIAA) champion 1919 team, a season in which he was All-Southern. He  was a standout as a punter and on defense in the win over the Mississippi Aggies.

References

All-Southern college football players
American football ends
Auburn Tigers football players
Sportspeople from Mobile, Alabama